Excitation-transfer theory purports that residual excitation from one stimulus will amplify the excitatory response to another stimulus, though the hedonic valences of the stimuli may differ. The excitation-transfer process is not limited to a single emotion. For example, when watching a movie, a viewer may be angered by seeing the hero wronged by the villain, but this initial excitation may intensify the viewer's pleasure in witnessing the villain's punishment later. Thus, although the excitation from the original stimulus of seeing the hero wronged was cognitively accessed as anger, the excitation after the second stimulus of seeing the villain punished is cognitively assessed as pleasure, though part of the excitation from the second stimulus is residual from the first.  
However, the excitation-transfer process requires the presence of three conditions. One: the second stimulus occurs before the complete decay of residual excitation from the first stimulus. Two: there is the misattribution of excitation, that is, after exposure to the second stimulus, the individual experiencing the excitation attributes full excitation to the second stimulus. Three: the individual has not reached an excitatory threshold before exposure to the second stimulus.

The Origins of Excitation-Transfer Theory
Dolf Zillmann began developing excitation-transfer theory in the late 1960s/ early 1970s, and through the start of the 21st century, Zillmann continued to refine it. Excitation-transfer theory is based largely on Clark Hull's notion of residual excitation (i.e., drive theory) and Stanley Schachter's two factor theory of emotion. As Bryant and Miron (2003) stated: 
Zillmann collapsed and connected Hull's drive theory and Schachter's two-factor theory, which posited an excitatory and a cognitive component of emotional states. In contrast to Hull's hypothesis that excitatory reactions "lose" their specificity under new stimulation, Schachter claimed that emotional arousal is nonspecific, and the individual cognitively assess the emotion he is experiencing for the purpose of behavioral guidance and adjustment. Zillmann adopted and modified Schacter's view on this. 
In other words, excitation-transfer theory is based on the assumption that excitation responses are, for the most part, ambiguous and are differentiated only by what emotions the brain assigns to them. As Zillmann (2006) stated, "Residual excitation from essentially any excited emotional reaction is capable of intensifying any other excited emotional reaction. The degree of intensification depends, of course, on the magnitude of residues prevailing at the time". Hence, excitation transfer theory helps to explain the fickleness of emotional arousal (i.e., how it is possible for fear to be transferred into relief, anger into delight, etc.), and how the reaction to one stimulus can intensify the reaction to another. 
Although excitation-transfer theory was based heavily on psychology, psychophysiology, and biochemistry, it has been often applied to effects studies in the field of communication. As Bryant and Miron explained, "Growing concern about the increasingly violent media content in the late 1960s and early 1970s spurred debate over the possible effects of such content on the real-life behavior of media consumers". Eventually, excitation-transfer theory became one of the dominant theoretical underpinnings for predicting, testing, and explaining the effects of such media (e.g., violent movies/ television shows, pornography, music etc.). Zillmann (1971) stated that "Communication-produced excitation may serve to intensify or 'energize' post-exposure emotional states". However, excitation transfer is not limited to face-to-face communication stimuli, but can occur from an array of stimuli, including mediated messages. Tannenbaum and Zillmann (1975) argued: 
Most people probably do not consider arousal from media exposure to be pronounced enough to warrant any attention, and hence they do not expect it to affect their behavior. Dismissing such arousals as trivial, the individual will tend to attribute any accumulating residues not to the preceding communication events [which are, in this instance, mediated messages] but to the new stimulus situations in which he finds himself. Moreover, by virtue of their very "unreal" and symbolic (possibly-fantasy encouraging) content, communication messages are generally not related to the person's real and immediate problems and concerns. This should further encourage misattribution of accruing arousal and hence make the person all the more vulnerable to transfer effects in his postcommunication behavior.  
In short, stimuli, whether they be in real-life, on a television or movie screen, or a combination of the two, can elicit excitation-transfers. Today, excitation-transfer theory remains a key component of the theoretical framework of studies focusing on communication and emotion.

References

Theories